Eeles Enok Landström (3 January 1932 – 29 June 2022) was a Finnish pole vaulter, a member of the Finnish parliament, and a business executive. He won two European titles, in 1954 and 1958, and competed at the 1956 and 1960 Olympics, winning a bronze medal in 1960 and finishing seventh in 1956. Landström also placed 14th in the decathlon at the 1952 games and was selected as the Olympic flag bearer for Finland in 1956 and 1960.

Biography
Landström was born in Viiala on 3 January 1932. Landström studied in the United States at the University of Michigan and graduated as Bachelor of Science in 1959. He was a two-time Big Ten champion in pole vaulting while at Michigan, in 1956 and 1959. In 1961 he became the first Finnish participant at the Olympic Academy arranged by the International Olympic Committee in Athens.

Landström was a member of the Finnish parliament from 1966 to 1971 and worked also in executive positions, for example as Assistant Director of Finance in the Finnish Broadcasting Company in 1976–1981 and as a member of the Administrative Council of the Finnish Broadcasting Company in 1967 to 1976. He was granted the Finnish honorary title of sosiaalineuvos in 2008.

Landström participated in the International Inter-Parliamentary Union (IPU) as a board member of Finland’s group and as a representative of Finland in the European Broadcasting Union, nominated by the Finnish Broadcasting Company. Landström has written two youth novels (1966, 1974) and a biography (2002). His first novel was awarded as the best Finnish youth novel in 1966.

Landström died on 29 June 2022 at the age of 90.

Achievements in pole vaulting
Landström participated in 30 international competitions, winning 25 of them in a row. His best achievements were European gold medals in 1954 and 1958, the only medals Finland won in these competitions. He also won eight consecutive Finnish titles in 1953–1960 and improved the Finnish record 13 times in 1954–1958. He improved the European record three times in 1955–1956 and set an Australian record in 1956. In 1961, he won the Nordic Championship. In 2008 Landström received the Finnish Pro Urheilu award for his athletic achievements.

Television and theater
A television documentary was made on Landström and his life in 1997, directed by Ville-Veikko Salminen. He was also the center figure in a play, which was written and directed by Jorma Kairimo. The premiere of the play ”Eeles – kohti päämäärää” (Eeles – towards the goal) took place in Akaa, Finland, in September 2008.

References

External links

 Chris Turner: HISTORY OF FINNISH ATHLETICS
 Finnish Olympic Committee: Statistics by Games
 

1932 births
2022 deaths
People from Viiala
Members of the Parliament of Finland (1966–70)
Finnish male pole vaulters
Michigan Wolverines men's track and field athletes
Athletes (track and field) at the 1952 Summer Olympics
Athletes (track and field) at the 1956 Summer Olympics
Athletes (track and field) at the 1960 Summer Olympics
Olympic athletes of Finland
Olympic bronze medalists for Finland
Pesäpallo players
European Athletics Championships medalists
Medalists at the 1960 Summer Olympics
Olympic bronze medalists in athletics (track and field)
Finnish sportsperson-politicians
Finnish business executives
20th-century Finnish businesspeople